Maria Schneider (born August 18, 1968) is an American humorist, cartoonist and illustrator best known for her work with the satirical online newspaper The Onion and her comic strip Pathetic Geek Stories.

Born and raised in Madison, Wisconsin, Schneider moved to New York City with the staff of The Onion in 2001. Her contributions include writing humor columns as a variety of characters: T. Herman Zweibel, Jean Teasdale and Herbert Kornfeld.

Schneider's comic strip, Pathetic Geek Stories, illustrates tales of pain and humiliation, usually during adolescence, sent to her by readers. In 2004, Pathetic Geek Stories formally ceased to be a feature in The Onion, moving to its own website. The site had not been updated since November 2008.

Books
In 2010, The Onion Presents A Book of Jean's Own!, a book-length collection of new material written by Schneider as Jean Teasdale, was published by St. Martin's Griffin. The book's front cover was illustrated by Mort Drucker. Publishers Weekly gave it a mixed review.

References

External links
 A Book of Jean's Own
 Pathetic Geek Stories
 Maria Schneider
 Twitter: Jean Teasdale

1968 births
American comic strip cartoonists
American humorists
Living people
The Onion people
Artists from Madison, Wisconsin
Writers from Madison, Wisconsin
Women humorists
21st-century American women writers
American female comics artists